Antheraea diehli is a moth of the family Saturniidae found in Sumatra, Borneo and Peninsular Malaysia. The species was first described by Claude Lemaire in 1979.

External links

Antheraea
Moths of Asia
Moths described in 1979